Bountiful may refer to:

Places
Bountiful (Book of Mormon) refers to two historical places:
Bountiful (Old World), location in Arabia
Bountiful (New World), a city in the Americas
 Bountiful, British Columbia, Canada
 Bountiful, Colorado, United States
 Bountiful, Utah, United States
 Bountiful Peak, Utah, US

Arts, entertainment, and media
 The Trip to Bountiful (play), 1953 play 
The Trip to Bountiful, 1985 film based on the play
, 2014 TV Movie

Other uses
 Bountiful, a variety of green beans

See also

Bounty (disambiguation)